Orhan Onar (1923 – 26 October 2009) was a Turkish judge. 

Onar was born in Ankara. He served as President of the Constitutional Court of Turkey from 28 July 1986 until 1 March 1988.

References

External links
Web-site of the Constitutional Court of Turkey 

Turkish judges
Turkish civil servants
1923 births
2009 deaths
Presidents of the Constitutional Court of Turkey
Members of the Council of State (Turkey)
Istanbul University Faculty of Law alumni